Robert Sedgewick (born December 20, 1946) is an American computer scientist. He is the founding chair and the William O. Baker Professor in Computer Science at Princeton University and was a member of the board of directors of Adobe Systems (1990–2016). He previously served on the faculty at Brown University and has held visiting research positions at Xerox PARC, Institute for Defense Analyses, and INRIA. His research expertise is in algorithm science, data structures, and analytic combinatorics. He is also active in developing the college curriculum in computer science and in harnessing technology to make that curriculum available to anyone seeking the opportunity to learn from it.

Early life 

Sedgewick was born on December 20, 1946 in Willimantic, Connecticut. During his childhood he lived in Storrs, Connecticut, where his parents Charles Hill Wallace Sedgewick and Rose Whelan Sedgewick were professors at the University of Connecticut.

In 1958, he moved with his parents to Wheaton, Maryland, a suburb of Washington, D.C., where he attended Wheaton High School, graduating in 1964.

Education 

Sedgewick earned his Bachelor of Science (1968) and Master of Science (1969) degrees in applied mathematics from Brown University, where he was a student of Andries van Dam.  He went on to graduate work at Stanford University where he was an advisee of Donald E. Knuth, receiving his PhD in 1975. His thesis was entitled Quicksort and was named an outstanding dissertation in computer science.

Work and academic career 

Sedgewick returned to Brown to start his academic career as an assistant professor in 1975, with promotion to associate professor in 1980 and full professor in 1983. At Brown, he participated in the founding of the computer science department, in 1979.

In 1985, Sedgewick joined the faculty at Princeton University as founding chair of the Department of Computer Science where he is now the William O. Baker *39 Professor of Computer Science. The first-year courses in computer science that he developed at Princeton are among the most popular courses ever offered at the university. He also pioneered the practice of replacing large live lectures with on-demand online videos.

Throughout his career, he has worked at research institutions outside of academia during summers and sabbatical leaves:
The Communications Research Division of the Institute for Defense Analyses in Princeton, New Jersey, an opportunity to work with the CRAY-1 supercomputer.
Xerox Palo Alto Research Center (PARC), an opportunity to see the personal computer come into existence.
The Institut National de Recherche en Informatique et en Automatique (INRIA) in France, a long and fruitful collaboration with Philippe Flajolet.

Research 

Sedgewick developed red-black trees (with Leonidas J. Guibas), ternary search trees (with Jon Bentley), and pairing heaps (with R. E. Tarjan and Michael Fredman). He solved open problems left by Donald Knuth in the analysis of quicksort, shellsort, heapsort (with R. Schaffer), and Batcher's sort. His books on algorithms are replete with novel implementations of classic algorithms and scientific studies comparing them, in Pascal (programming language), C (programming language), C++, Modula-3, and Java (programming language) (See Bibliography). He is known for emphasizing a scientific approach to the analysis of algorithms, based on validating mathematical models with experimental work using realistic data. With Philippe Flajolet, he developed the field of mathematics known as analytic combinatorics.

He has organized research meetings and conferences on data structures, algorithm science, and analytic combinatorics around the world, including Dagstuhl seminars on analysis of algorithms and data structures,. In particular, in 1993, together with Rainer Kemp, Philippe Flajolet and Helmut Prodinger, he initiated the successful series of workshops and conferences which was key to the development of a research community around the analysis of algorithms, and which evolved into the AofA—International Meeting on Combinatorial, Probabilistic, and Asymptotic Methods in the Analysis of Algorithms. Robert Sedgewick was also the main proponent and organizer of the first editions of the SIAM Meetings on Analytic Algorithmics and Combinatorics (ANALCO), a series of meetings annually held from 2004 to 2019, co-located with the Symposium on Discrete Algorithms (SODA).

Publishing 

Sedgewick is the author of twenty books. He is best known for Algorithms, originally published in 1983 and now in its fourth edition. His 2008 book with Philippe Flajolet, Analytic Combinatorics, was awarded the Leroy P. Steele Prize for mathematical exposition by the American Mathematical Society. His most recent book, co-authored with Kevin Wayne, is Computer Science: An Interdisciplinary Approach.

Online learning 

Sedgewick is a pioneer in the development of massive open online courses, currently offering six MOOCs. With Kevin Wayne, he developed a scalable model that integrates the textbook, studio-produced online lectures, and extensive online content. Their two MOOCs and online content on algorithms are among the most popular on the web and have provided the opportunity for over one million registrants to learn from them at no cost.

He is an active advocate for expanding the reach of computer science, and is featured in articles in the Chronicle of Higher Education, the American Enterprise Institute, and the Washington Post, with essays published in the Wall Street Journal and Inside Higher Ed.

Awards 

 Flajolet Lecture Prize. AofA—International Meeting on Combinatorial, Probabilistic, and Asymptotic Methods in the Analysis of Algorithms, 2016.
 Leroy P. Steele Prize for Mathematical Exposition. American Mathematical Society, 2019.
 Karl V. Karlstrom Outstanding Educator Award. Association for Computing Machinery, 2019.

Recent books and online content 

 	Computer Science: An Interdisciplinary Approach (with K. Wayne). Addison-Wesley, Reading, MA, 2016, 1131 pp. Associated online content: Booksite, curated lectures Part 1 and Part 2, and MOOCs Part 1 and Part 2. 
 	Algorithms, Fourth Edition (with K. Wayne). Addison-Wesley, Reading, MA, 2011, 955 pp. Earlier editions: 11 books, using 5 programming languages, translated into many foreign languages, 1983–2003. Associated online content: Booksite, curated lectures, and MOOCs Part 1 and Part 2.
 	An Introduction to the Analysis of Algorithms, Second Edition (with P. Flajolet). Addison-Wesley, Reading, MA, 2013, 572 pp. First edition, 1996. Associated online content: Booksite, curated lectures, and MOOC.
 	Analytic Combinatorics (with P. Flajolet). Cambridge University Press, 2009, 824pp. Associated online content: Booksite, curated lectures, and MOOC.

Personal life 

Sedgewick lives in Princeton, New Jersey and spends summers in Jamestown, Rhode Island with his wife Linda (née Migneault), married in 1971. They have four children.

Bibliography

References

External links 
Robert Sedgewick's home page
People of the ACM
Google Scholar
Video interview with Robert Sedgewick for Princeton Startup TV  (04.06.2012)

1946 births
Living people
American computer scientists
Fellows of the Association for Computing Machinery
Place of birth missing (living people)
Brown University faculty
Princeton University faculty
Stanford University School of Engineering alumni